Kate Mildenhall is an Australian author, best known for her 2016 debut novel Skylarking.

Personal life 
Mildenhall was born in Melbourne, Australia and lived in what is described as the 'green fringe' of Melbourne. She attended Eltham High School. Growing up Mildenhall wanted to be "An Oscar winning film director".

Mildenhall had spent a lot of time during her teenage years camping on an isolated cape, at Point Hicks, and had even stayed in the lighthouse there.

Mildenhall currently co-hosts the First Time podcast with her friend and writer Katherine Collette. Mildenhall describes the podcast as "part reality show, part writers’ master class".

Mildenhall is married with two daughters.

Writing career

Her debut novel, Skylarking, was published in Australia by Black Inc. in 2016 and in the UK by Legend Press in 2017. Skylarking was longlisted for the Voss Literary Prize (2017) and the Indie Book Awards (2017). She described the process of pitching Skylarking to the Sunday Age in 2016: she had approached a speaker at the Emerging Writers Festival, then "mumbled a terrible pitch, but left with an invitation to send her my first 10,000 words. The rest is a blur, but ended in a contract with Black Inc".

The novel centers around two best friends who are growing up together on an isolated Australian cape in the 1880s.

The Courier-Mail, referring to the true story on which Skylarking is based, wrote "it's testament to Kate Mildenhall’s skill that you become so immersed in the lives of best friends Kate and Harriet you feel the dread, but hope it will not be so. The Sydney Morning Herald review noted "Skylarking seems a rather jaunty title for a story about (unrequited) love and loss, but before we arrive at the unexpectedly tragic swerve in the narrative there's a lot of joy in Kate Mildenhall's debut".

Annie Condon from Readings Monthly said of the book: "It is hard to believe that Skylarking is Kate Mildenhall's debut novel, as her ability to create both character and atmosphere is impressive". Author Clare Wright described Skylarking as "historical fiction at its evocative best, while author Hannah Kent wrote that it was one of her favourite books of 2016, and stated that she hoped Mildenhall would continue to write, as she had "an abundance of talent".

Her second novel, The Mother Fault, was published by Simon & Schuster in September 2020. It was shortlisted for the 2020 Aurealis Award for best science fiction novel.

References 

Australian women novelists
Australian historical novelists
21st-century Australian women writers
Writers from Melbourne
21st-century Australian novelists
Women historical novelists
Living people
Year of birth missing (living people)